Pitcairnia secundiflora is a plant species in the genus Pitcairnia. This species is endemic to Mexico and guatemala.

References

secundiflora
Flora of Mexico